Bulhary can refer to:

 Bulhary (Břeclav District) a village and municipality in Czech Republic
 Bulhary, Lučenec District a village and municipality in Slovak Republic